Spelaeanthus is a genus of flowering plants belonging to the family Gesneriaceae.

Its native range is Malaysian Peninsula.

Species
Species:
 Spelaeanthus chinii Kiew, A.Weber & B.L.Burtt

References

Didymocarpoideae
Gesneriaceae genera